Charlie Williams (born 15 February 1944) is a Maltese former professional soccer player.

Williams learned to play soccer in the streets of Valletta. At the age of ten, he started playing organized soccer for the Valletta Lilywhites in the Valletta youth league. Williams entered Stella Maris College when he was 11 years old. He represented his school's top team on a regular basis.

During his playing days at the Independence Arena, Charlie was discovered by Valletta FC officials and was asked to join Valletta FC at the age of 13 years. At 16 years old, Charlie was the captain of the Valletta FC minors team, while also playing for the under-21 team and the Valletta FC reserves team on a regular basis.

The Malta Football Association (MFA) quickly picked him to represent Malta as a youth International. Charlie Williams made his Valletta FC debut at age 17, playing a midfielder. He scored many important goals for Valletta FC, notably against Norwich City FC. Another crucial goal was against Floriana FC 3 minutes from time to give Valletta FC their 1962/63 championship.

During his stay with Valletta FC, Williams  won the League Championship, Scicluna Cup, FA Trophy and the Cassar Cup.
He represented Valletta FC in European competitions, playing against Dukla Prague in the UEFA Champions League (formerly the European Cup) and against Real Zaragoza in the UEFA Europa League (formerly UEFA Cup Winners' Cup).

At the age of 18, Charlie Williams made his International debut playing for the Malta National Football Team against Italy C. He also played for the Malta National Football Team at the Liguria, Italy tournament where Malta finished in 3rd place, beating Italy and tying the Netherlands.

At the age of 23, first Norwich City FC, and then the newly formed professional soccer league in the USA, National Professional Soccer League (NPSL), were recruiting Williams. In 1967 Charlie decided to sign a professional contract to play in the NPSL, which later became the NASL. Charlie was a pioneer in North American soccer, as he was one of the first players to form the original founding teams. Among the American sides he played for were the Pittsburgh Phantoms, San Diego Toros, Dallas Tornado and Rochester Lancers. He also played for ASL sides Syracuse Scorpions, Syracuse Suns and Boston Astros.

When Williams retired from playing, he decided to take up a coaching career. In 1995, he was voted Best Coach in the State of New York. He also founded and operated his own soccer academy from 1993 to 2006. Charlie retired from soccer activities in 2010.

Foreign Cup Appearances
European Cup: 2 
 1963

Valletta FC 0 vs Dukla (Czech) 6 
 1963

Valletta FC 0 vs Dukla (Czech) 2 
 1963

UEFA Cup Winners' Cup: 2 
 1964

Valletta FC 0 vs Saragozza (Spain) 3 
 1964

Valletta FC 1 vs Saragozza (Spain) 5 
 1964

Domestic Cup Appearances
Maltese FA Trophy: 9 
 1962, 1963, 1964, 1965

Cassar Cup: 6 
 1962, 1963, 1966

Sports Festival Shield: 1 
 1962

Olympic Cup: 2 
 1963

Douglas Cup: 2 
 1963, 1964

Charity Shield: 2 
 1963, 1964

Scicluna Cup: 2 
 1964, 1966

Independence Cup: 1 
 1964

Testaferata Cup: 1 
 1965

Christmas Cup: 3 
 1966, 1967

Christmas Tournament Appearances

Valletta FC 6 vs Ittihad (Libya) 2 *Williams scored the 4th goal
 1962

Valletta FC 1 vs FK Sarajevo (Yugoslavia) 1
 1962

Valletta FC 0 vs HNK Rijeka (Yugoslavia) 2
 1962

Valletta FC 1 vs SK Motorlet Prague (Czech Republic) 1
 1963

Valletta FC 0 vs First Vienna FC (Austria) 1
 1965

Sports Festival Shield

Valletta FC 3 vs  Sliema 1
 1962

Friendlies Appearances Against Foreign Teams

Valletta FC 1 vs  Ahli S.C. (Tripoli) 1
 1962

Valletta FC 4 vs  S.C. Ahly (Benghazi) 1
 1962

Valletta FC 3 vs  Hilal (Benghazi) 2
 1962

Valletta FC 0 vs  S.C. Medina (Benghazi) 1
 1963

Valletta FC 0 vs  Ittihad (Benghazi) 2
 1963

Valletta FC vs Najma (Libya)
 1963

Valletta FC 1 vs Norwich City FC (UK) 1 *Williams scored the goal
 1964

San Diego Toros 1 vs Cruz Azul (Mexico) 2 
 1968

San Diego Toros 1 vs Club Deportivo Guadalajara (Mexico) 1 
 1968

References

Nasljerseys.com: Charles Williams
Valletta FC Hall of Fame: Charlie Williams
Timesofmalta.com: Valletta Spoil Canaries 100% Record
Timesofmalta.com: City Sees Off Blues Challenge
Timesofmalta.com: Zammit hits hat-trick in 1966 final
Netnews.com: Charlie Williams soccer career in the United States

Living people
1944 births
Dallas Tornado players
Maltese footballers
Maltese expatriate footballers
Valletta F.C. players
Malta international footballers
North American Soccer League (1968–1984) players
National Professional Soccer League (1967) players
American Soccer League (1933–1983) players
People from Valletta
Pittsburgh Phantoms players
Rochester Lancers (1967–1980) players
San Diego Toros players
Syracuse Scorpions players
Expatriate soccer players in the United States
Maltese expatriate sportspeople in the United States
Association football midfielders
Boston Astros players